The Kurume Cup is a tennis tournament held in Kurume, Japan. Held since 2005, this ITF Circuit event is a $60,000 tournament. It started off being a $25,000 event in 2005 and went up to $50,000 in 2008, this event is played on outdoor carpet courts.

Past finals

Singles

Doubles

External links 
  

 
Tennis tournaments in Japan
Carpet court tennis tournaments
ITF Women's World Tennis Tour
Recurring sporting events established in 2005